The 2020 FIU Panthers football team represented Florida International University (FIU) in the 2020 NCAA Division I FBS football season. The Panthers played their home games at Riccardo Silva Stadium in Miami, Florida, and competed in the East Division of Conference USA (C-USA). They were led by fourth-year head coach Butch Davis. The season was notably truncated due to several cancellations stemming from the effects of the worldwide COVID-19 pandemic.

Schedule
This years season intended to feature nine games. FIU had scheduled Old Dominion and UMass, which were canceled. Both schools would not play football in the fall over concerns related to the COVID-19 pandemic. Although UMass reversed their decision they intend to schedule and play a limited number of football games this fall. UCF was also scheduled for September 12, 2020 but later called off due to FIU choosing to resume athletics on September 16, 2020. On November 3, 2020, the game against UTEP was canceled due to positive testing of COVID-19.

Schedule Source:

Game summaries

at Liberty

Middle Tennessee

Jacksonville State

Florida Atlantic

at Western Kentucky

References

FIU
FIU Panthers football seasons
FIU Panthers football
College football winless seasons